"Rum and Coca-Cola" is a popular calypso song composed by Lionel Belasco with lyrics by Lord Invader.  The song was copyrighted in the United States by entertainer Morey Amsterdam and was a hit in 1945 for the Andrews Sisters.

History

The song was published in the United States with Amsterdam listed as lyricist and Jeri Sullivan and Paul Baron as composers. The melody had been previously published as the work of Venezuelan calypso composer Lionel Belasco on a song titled "L'Année Passée," which was in turn based on a folk song from Martinique. The lyrics to "Rum and Coca-Cola" were written by Rupert Grant, another calypso musician from Trinidad who used the stage name Lord Invader.

The song became a local hit and was at the peak of its popularity when Amsterdam visited the island in September 1943 as part of a U.S.O. tour. Although he  claimed never to have heard the song during the month he spent on the island, the lyrics to his version are clearly based on the Lord Invader version, with the music and chorus being virtually identical. However, Amsterdam's version strips the song of its social commentary. The Lord Invader version laments that U.S. soldiers are debauching local women who "saw that the Yankees treat them nice/and they give them a better price." Its final stanza describes a newlywed couple whose marriage is ruined when "the bride run away with a soldier lad/and the stupid husband went staring mad." The Amsterdam version also hints that women are prostituting themselves, preserving the Lord Invader chorus which says, "Both mother and daughter/Working for the Yankee dollar."

The Andrews Sisters also seem to have given little thought to the meaning of the lyrics. According to Patty Andrews, "We had a recording date, and the song was brought to us the night before the recording date. We hardly really knew it, and when we went in we had some extra time and we just threw it in, and that was the miracle of it. It was actually a faked arrangement. There was no written background, so we just kind of faked it." In under ten minutes they made a record that sold seven million units and sat at number one on the Billboard magazine chart for seven weeks. Maxine Andrews recalled, "The rhythm was what attracted the Andrews Sisters to 'Rum and Coca-Cola'. We never thought of the lyric. The lyric was there, it was cute, but we didn't think of what it meant; but at that time, nobody else would think of it either, because we weren't as morally open as we are today and so, a lot of stuff—really, no excuses—just went over our heads." Some stations refused to play the song because it mentioned rum, and alcohol couldn't be advertised on the air, or because it mentioned the brand name Coca-Cola, which was perceived as advertising for the soft drink.

In the Songs That Won The War Vol. 8 Swing Again, Yes Indeed! CD program notes, Edward Habib writes, "'Rum and Coca Cola' has naughty lyrics but not quite naughty enough to deny its hit status...During the forties, comedians as songwriters was the norm, Phil Silvers, Joey Bishop and Jackie Gleason all had a part in writing hit songs. While there were a number of records of 'Rum and Coca Cola', the Andrews Sisters' version was far and away the most popular."

After the release of "Rum and Coca-Cola", Belasco and Lord Invader sued for copyright infringement of the song's music and lyrics, respectively. In 1948, after years of litigation, both plaintiffs won their cases, with Lord Invader receiving an award of $150,000 in owed royalties. However, Morey Amsterdam was allowed to retain copyright to the song. Lord Invader also wrote a follow-up song to "Rum and Coca-Cola", titled "Yankee Dollar".

Calypsonian and Calypso Monarch winner Devon Seale, first premiered his tribute to Lionel Belasco entitled "Lio", at the Calypso Revue tent in 1999. That year, he would take it to the annual Calyspo Monarch finals. In the tribute, Seale references the Andrews Sisters' recording of "Rum and Coca-Cola" and the winning copyright case. He sings, "I bring evidence quick to show them that I write the song in 1906", and "thirty years later Invader changed the lyrics ... I am Lio-Lionel Belasco." Since the Andrew Sisters' release, many other artists have shared their renditions of the popular tune, including American singer-songwriter Harry Belafonte.

Chart performance
"Rum and Coca-Cola" spent ten weeks at the top of the Billboard Pop Singles chart. On the Harlem Hit Parade chart, it went to number three.

References

Further reading
 Louis Nizer (1961/1963), My Life in Court, reprint, New York:  Pyramid, Chapter 3, "Talent", pp. 265–327.

External links
  Legal opinion by New York District Judge Simon Rifkind

1945 singles
Calypso songs
Trinidad and Tobago songs
The Andrews Sisters songs
Songs about alcohol
Coca-Cola in popular culture
Songs involved in plagiarism controversies
Songs of World War II
Songs written by Lionel Belasco
Songs written by Lord Invader